Village Book 2 is a supplement for fantasy role-playing games published by Judges Guild in 1979.

Contents
Village Book 2 is a GM's aid: 50 village maps that can be used for wilderness encounters or campaign design, with tables for random generation of heraldry and coats of arms.

Publication history
Village Book 2 was written by Bryan Hinnen, Mark Holmer, and Mitch Johnson, with Bob Bledsaw, and a cover by Jennell Jaquays, and was published by Judges Guild in 1979 as a 64-page book.

Different Worlds Publications later acquired and distributed game products formerly produced by Judges Guild, including Village Book 1, Village Book 2, Castle Book I, and Castle Book II.

Reception
Patrick Amory reviewed Villages Book II for Different Worlds magazine and stated that "In the front are some what confusing but well researched and fairly accurate rules on generating heraldic coats of arms, shields, and devices."

Ken Rolston reviewed the Different Worlds Publications version of Village Book 1 in The Dragon #133.  Rolston commented that "[The] book contains the layouts of about 50 different villages, small towns, and castles, all drawn on hex sheets. There are no details for the functions or contents of the individual buildings, but it's nice to have the layouts when whipping up an adventure setting on short notice."

Reviews
 Different Worlds #6 (Dec 1979)

Notes

References

Judges Guild fantasy role-playing game supplements
Role-playing game supplements introduced in 1979